Highbury Preparatory School is a South African private school for boys located in Hillcrest (eThekwini Metropolitan Municipality), KwaZulu-Natal.

History
Highbury was founded in 1903 by Sibella Douglas McMillan. It was named after Highbury House School in England, which was established by Sibella McMillan's father.

Head mistresses
Sibella Douglas McMillan (Known to pupils as Granny McMillan)

Head masters
S McMillan
J McMillan
Robert Clarence
Richard Stanly
Brendon Carol (January 2015 - July 2016
Roland Lacock (January 2017 – present)

Notable alumni

Imraan Coovadia (author)
Dale Benkenstein (cricketer)
Paul Maritz (former Microsoft executive; VMware CEO)
Mike Melvill (test pilot)
Mike Procter (cricketer)
Bobby Skinstad (rugby player)
Robert McLaren (Author and Oxford Rhodes Scholar)
Lungi Ngidi (cricketer)

Highbury Today

Highbury accepts day pupils up to grade 7. It has a pupil-teacher ratio of 12:1.

Richard Stanley who succeeded  Mr Clarence in 1994, was followed by Brendon Carrol in January 2015. In July 2017, Roland Lacock become Highbury's sixth Head Master.

Highbury has a co-educational pre-primary school called the Weavers' Nest. In 2017 Weavers' opened a Grade 0000 class.

References

External links
Highbury official site

Nondenominational Christian schools in South Africa
Private schools in KwaZulu-Natal
Educational institutions established in 1903

1903 establishments in the Colony of Natal
eThekwini Metropolitan Municipality